St Martin's Hospital may refer to:
St Martin's House, Brisbane, Australia
St Martin's Hospital, Canterbury, England
St Martins' Hospital, Malindi, Malawi